Nižná is a village and municipality in Tvrdošín District in the Žilina Region of northern Slovakia.

History
In historical records the village was first mentioned in 1420 as Nissne Wes.

Geography
The municipality lies at an altitude of 573 metres and covers an area of 27.779 km². It has a population of about 4,140 people.

Twin towns — sister cities

Nižná is twinned with:
 Horní Suchá, Czech Republic
 Mszana Dolna, Poland

References

External links
http://www.nizna.sk/

Villages and municipalities in Tvrdošín District